Flor de Maroñas is a barrio (neighbourhood or district) of Montevideo, Uruguay.

Location
It borders Villa Española to the southwest, Ituzaingó to the west, Jardines del Hipódromo to the north and northwest, Bañados de Carrasco to the east and northeast, Maroñas / Parque Guaraní to the south.

Places of worship
 Parish Church of St Gemma Galgani (Roman Catholic)

See also 
Barrios of Montevideo

External links 
www.uruguayinforme.com Article on the barrio
 Revista Raices / Historia del barrio Maroñas

Barrios of Montevideo